Kulcha is a type of mildly leavened Indian flatbread that originated in the state of Punjab and was made popular in the national capital of Delhi.

Origin
Kulcha is said to have originated in the Punjab region of India, possibly in Amritsar. The dish then went to be popularised and made a delicacy in the national capital, New Delhi.

Recipe
Kulcha is made from maida flour, water, a pinch of salt and a leavening agent (yeast or old kulcha dough), mixed together by hand to make a very tight dough. This dough is covered with a wet cloth and left to stand for an hour or so in a warm place. The result is a slight leavening of the dough but not much. The flour is kneaded again by hand and then rolled out using a rolling pin into a flat, round shape. It is baked in an earthen clay oven ("tandoor") until done. When baked, it is often brushed with butter or ghee, although this is not necessary. It is then eaten with any Indian curry. In particular, a spicy chickpea curry known as chole is the dish of choice for being eaten with kulcha.

Variations
In the first variant, instead of using water to knead the dough, milk or yogurt can be used; this results in the dough becoming softer and more rubbery. This type of kulcha is known as doodhia kulcha (milk kulcha). Leavening is often greater if yogurt is used.

This variant of kulchas are not stuffed but made plain and eaten with a curry which can be either vegetarian or meat-based.

The second variant are the kulchas stuffed with fillings that were served during the period of Mughals and Nizams in their Darbars.  For example, in Awadh region, Awadhi Kulcha is served with Nahari, a mutton based dish.

Nowadays, these are sold in restaurant and shops. Jammu's Kaladi Kulcha which is made with traditional Dogra Cheese i.e. Kaladi Cheese is one of the most-loved street foods in Jammu. Kaladi cheese is sautéed in oil on a pan, cooked till brown in colour from both sides and stuffed between roasted kulchas.

Amritsari kulcha, a.k.a. amritsari naan, is a modern recipe which has become one of the favorite breakfast choices for the local population of Amritsar. 

In entire North India, range of stuffings, including paneer (cottage cheese), potatoes, onion and other vegetables are used to stuff these kulchas.

In Pakistan, kulcha breads are largely eaten in certain parts of the Hazara and northern Punjab regions, where they are a popular breakfast item.

See also
List of Indian breads
List of Pakistani breads

References

External links
 

Indian breads
Pakistani breads
Indian cuisine
Kashmiri cuisine
Punjabi cuisine
Punjabi words and phrases
Roti
Flatbread dishes
Indo-Caribbean cuisine